José Carmen Arturo Alcántara Rojas (born 16 July 1959) is a Mexican politician affiliated with the Institutional Revolutionary Party. As of 2014 he served as Deputy of the LIX Legislature of the Mexican Congress as a plurinominal representative.

References

1959 births
Living people
Politicians from the State of Mexico
Members of the Chamber of Deputies (Mexico)
Institutional Revolutionary Party politicians
Deputies of the LIX Legislature of Mexico